Alphus capixaba is a species of beetle in the family Cerambycidae. It was described by Marinoni and Martins in 1978.

References

Acanthoderini
Beetles described in 1978